Friendship Baptist Church is a Baptist church in Pasadena, California. The oldest black Baptist church in Pasadena, the church was built in 1925 to serve a congregation founded in 1893. The church was designed by Norman F. Marsh in the Spanish Colonial Revival style. Its design includes a tower, a bell-gable, a tile roof, and stained-glass windows. It was listed in the National Register of Historic Places on November 20, 1978.

References

External links

Churches in Pasadena, California
Buildings and structures on the National Register of Historic Places in Pasadena, California
Churches on the National Register of Historic Places in California
Churches completed in 1925
Religious organizations established in 1893
Spanish Colonial Revival architecture in California